Senator Dickinson may refer to:

Members of the United States Senate
Daniel S. Dickinson (1800–1866), U.S. Senator from New York from 1844 to 1851
Lester J. Dickinson (1873–1968), U.S. Senator from Iowa from 1931 to 1937
Philemon Dickinson (1739–1809), U.S. Senator from New Jersey from  1790 to 1793

United States state senate members
Andrew B. Dickinson (1801–1873), New York State Senate
Clement C. Dickinson (1849–1938), Missouri State Senate
Fairleigh Dickinson Jr. (1919–1996), New Jersey State Senate
James Shelton Dickinson (1818–1882), Alabama State Senate
John Dickinson (1732–1808), Delaware State Senate
Luren Dickinson (1859–1943), Michigan State Senate
Wells S. Dickinson (1828–1892), New York State Senate